Millennium's End is a role-playing game published in 1991 by Chameleon Eclectic Entertainment.

Description
Millennium's End is a technothriller set in the year 1999.

Reception
Millennium's End was ranked 31st in the 1996 reader poll of Arcane magazine to determine the 50 most popular roleplaying games of all time.  The UK magazine's editor Paul Pettengale commented: "Millennium's End struggles hard to cut the right balance between fiction and reality, and just manages it. The game system is detailed, but this allows it to model the style of fiction it's based on with more accuracy. Players carry out investigations, espionage, and paramilitary operations, all of which are ably supported."

Reviews
Rollespilsmagasinet Fønix (Danish) (Issue 8 - May/June 1995)
 Shadis #13 (May, 1994)
 Shadis #32 (1996)
 White Wolf #28 (Aug./Sept., 1991)
 White Wolf #46 (Aug., 1994)

References

Espionage role-playing games
Role-playing games introduced in 1991